Chloé Dépouilly (born 6 December 1990 in Reims) is a French figure skater who competes in ladies' singles. She has represented both France and South Africa during her competitive career.

The daughter of French skating champion Laurent Dépouilly, Dépouilly finished second at the French Figure Skating Championships in 2008. She later finished second at the South African Figure Skating Championships in 2012.

External links
 
 South African Figure Skating Championship profile

1990 births
French female single skaters
South African female single skaters
Living people
Sportspeople from Reims